The 2014 Liga Nusantara North Sumatra season is the first edition of Liga Nusantara North Sumatra is a qualifying round of the 2014 Liga Nusantara.

The competition scheduled starts in May 2014.

Teams
Scheduled Liga Nusantara in North Sumatra Province Association will be followed 42 clubs with a variety of requirements that must be followed by the participants.

Format & regulations
Association of North Sumatra Province will prepare implementing regulations Liga Nusantara which will be presented to the club at the time of managers meeting on May 2, 2014.

League table & result
42 clubs of Liga Nusantara North Sumatra divided into five groups.

Group A

Group B

Group C

Group D

Group E

References

North Sumatra